WE Communications (previously Waggener Edstrom) and commonly known as WE is a global public relations and integrated marketing communications firm often associated with its largest client, Microsoft. The firm was founded in 1983 by Melissa Waggener Zorkin.

History
The Waggener Group was founded in 1983 by Melissa Waggener Zorkin. In 1984, Pam Edstrom joined the firm, which was renamed Waggener Edstrom. Edstrom previously worked for Microsoft, which became one of the agency's first clients.

The firm acquired PR.com in 2001, Maloney & Fox in 2003, Shout Holdings in 2004, Patzer PR in 2012, Buchan in 2016, Red Bridge Consulting and WATATAWA in 2017, Avian Media in 2018 and Codeword in 2019.

In September 2015, the company re-branded as WE Communications.

Pam Edstrom died in March 2017 and later that year was posthumously inducted in the PR Hall of Fame.

Services
WE Communications focuses on three sectors — healthcare, consumer and technology. Its services include media relations, corporate and executive communications, digital marketing, creative, social media and content strategy, crisis communications, insights and analytics, corporate social responsibility, brand purpose and reputation.

Notable clients and campaigns
Notable clients include Microsoft, Volvo, Boehringer Ingelheim, VSP, Honeywell, Tencent, Cisco, McDonald's, Tabula Rasa, Brother, Amgen, Gilead, iRobot, RSA, Lenovo, the Bill & Melinda Gates Foundation, AT&T and others.

WE Communications is often associated with its work for Microsoft, one of its first clients. In the firm's early years, this relationship  led to it working primarily with other technology companies, before expanding into healthcare, consumer and other sectors.

For more than a decade, WE Communications supported Mercy Corps on a pro-bono basis after CEO Waggener Zorkin took on the client after visiting the Good Shepherd orphanage in Ghana.

In 2007, a WE Communications employee accidentally sent Wired journalist Fred Vogelstein his own thirteen-page briefing sheet. The document included commentary about his reporting and interview style being "tricky" and "sensational...though he would consider them to be balanced and fair."

In 2018 WE Communications handled the PR for the McDelivery Day 2.0 and was shortlisted for PRWeek Global Award.

Awards 

 In 2010 WE Communications was named the Technology Agency of the Decade by The Holmes Report. 
 In 2015, Volvo's Greatest Interception Ever campaign, executed in partnership with Grey New York, won two Cannes Lions awards as well as the Cannes Lions Grand Prix for Campaign.
 In 2016, WE Communications was named one of PRWeek Asia's Best Places to Work in the medium agency category. 
 CEO Melissa Waggener Zorkin was inducted into the PRWeek Hall of Femme in 2017 and Pam Edstrom was posthumously elected to the PR Hall of Fame.
 WE Buchan won the Large PR Agency of the Year Award at the Mumbrella CommsCon Awards in 2018 and 2019. 
 WE Communications was shortlisted for PRWeek U.S.'s Outstanding Large Agency award and for the PRWeek Global Awards' Best Agency in Asia-Pacific in 2019.

References

External links

 WE

Privately held companies based in Washington (state)
American companies established in 1983
Marketing companies established in 1983
Public relations companies of the United States
Companies based in Seattle
1983 establishments in Washington (state)